All Wet is a 2016 French music album by Mr. Oizo.

All Wet may also refer to:

 All Wet, a 1921 American film starring Bud Duncan
 All Wet, a 1922 American film starring Al St. John
 All Wet (1924 film), an American film starring Charley Chase
 All Wet, a 1926 American film starring Snub Pollard
 All Wet (1927 film), an American cartoon